Pine Hollow may refer to:

Pine Hollow (Oregon County, Missouri)
Pine Hollow, Oregon
Pine Hollow Cemetery, listed on the National Register of Historic Places in Oyster Bay, New York
Pine Hollow, a spin-off series (1998–2001) of The Saddle Club pony books